The Melodi Grand Prix Junior 2009 was Norway's eighth national Melodi Grand Prix Junior for young singers aged 8 to 15. It was held in Oslo Spektrum, Oslo, Norway and broadcast live Norwegian Broadcasting Corporation (NRK) in September 2009.

There were 540 submissions out of which 10 were chosen for the finals, a mix of solo singers, but also two bands, and two hip-hop contributions. The competition was won by Jørgen Dahl Moe with his song "Din egen vei" and the runner up was Mystery with their song "Rock e sunt". Bothe went on to represent Norway in MGP Nordic 2009.

The album Melodi Grand Prix Junior 2009 containing the songs of the finals reached No. 1 on the VG-lista Norwegian Albums Chart on week 38 of 2005 staying at the top of the charts for 1 week.

Results

First round

Super Final
The exact number of public votes was unknown. Only first and second places were announced during then.

References

Melodi Grand Prix Junior
Music festivals in Norway